Mothers Heaven is the second album from the Scottish rock band Texas. The album was released on 23 September 1991 by Mercury Records. The album peaked at no. 32 in the UK and spent 4 weeks on the charts.

Background information

The album saw the release of four singles, the lead single released from Mothers Heaven was entitled "Why Believe in You" which only managed to reach #66 on the UK Singles Charts in September 1991. Follow on single, the alternative rock track, "In My Heart" was released on 14 October 1991 but only managed to reach #74 in the United Kingdom. However, "In My Heart" became Texas's last song to date to chart in the United States, peaking at #14 on the Billboard Hot Rock Tracks chart. The song also reached #44 in France.

The release of a third single was based entirely on the success of the band in countries such as France, Spain and other European countries, as the band's singles were doing particularly poorly in their native United Kingdom. The third single, "Alone with You", saw Texas return to the UK Singles Charts Top 40 (for the first time since their debut single three years earlier), peaking at #32. The single also continued the success of the band in France, reaching #28. The fourth and final single, a remix of the title track "Mothers Heaven" was released in 1992, but failed to chart in any countries. Ironically, after the disappointing performance of singles from the album, the band then released a new cover version of the Al Green classic "Tired of Being Alone", which returned them to the UK Top 20. The track was not available on any album until the band's Greatest Hits album released in 2000.

Mothers Heaven is the band's lowest charting album in the UK where it remains uncertified, however, it has been certified Gold in both France and Switzerland.

Critical reception

AllMusic Guide gave the album three stars out of five, and commented:

Texas is a good name for this band, whose sound is open, brooding and just a bit on the twangy side; if you can imagine a sound somewhere between the dour, minimalist bluesiness of Cowboy Junkies and the yearning, gospel-tinged bombast of early U2, you'll have a good idea what to expect. Singer Sharleen Spiteri has the perfect voice for this kind of thing: it's low-pitched and dark-hued, and is shown off to best effect when she's belting out big, cathartic numbers like the title track and "Why Believe in You." Ally McErlaine is a brilliant slide guitarist who can move from grungy, greasy rock to desolate acoustic Delta blues without missing a beat. It's true that the group still needs to digest its influences a bit -- "Dream Hotel," in particular, sounds like a U2 reject—but most of the time, Texas does a good job of mapping out its own territory. And this is just their second album, remember. ~ Rick Anderson, All Music Guide

Track listing

International release 
All songs written by Johnny McElhone and Sharleen Spiteri except as indicated.

Personnel 
 Recorded at: Park Lane Studios, Glasgow, Scotland and The Mill Recording Studios, Cookham, Berkshire.

Texas
 Ally McErlaine - guitar
 Johnny McElhone - bass
 Sharleen Spiteri - vocals, guitar
 Eddie Campbell - keyboards
 Richard Hynd - drums

Other Personnel
 Engineer - George Shilling, Kenny MacDonald, Simon Vinestock
 Mastered By - Bob Ludwig
 Producer - Tim Palmer
 Voice [Call Out Stuart Kerr Gouranga, Be Happy] - Stuart Kerr
 Backing Vocals on Track 1 - Maria McKee

Charts

Certifications and sales

References 

1991 albums
Texas (band) albums
Albums produced by Tim Palmer
Mercury Records albums
Vertigo Records albums